Avelino Arquero is a Pueblo-American painter from the Cochití Pueblo. He studied at the Santa Fe Indian School in the 1930s and has exhibited his work across the country. He is known for his work with tempera painting.

References 

20th-century American painters
20th-century indigenous painters of the Americas
Native American painters
Painters from New Mexico
Pueblo artists